Susana A. Mendoza is an American politician. She is the 10th comptroller of Illinois, serving since December 2016. A member of the Democratic Party, she formerly served as Chicago city clerk and as an Illinois State Representative, representing the 1st District of Illinois.

Mendoza was first elected as State Representative in 2000 and served into her sixth term, when she won the election for City Clerk of Chicago in February 2011, becoming the first female city clerk. She served in the position for five years until successfully running for the position of comptroller of Illinois in 2016.

Mendoza ran unsuccessfully in the 2019 Chicago mayoral election.

Early life
Mendoza was born in Chicago to Joaquin and Susana Mendoza, who had emigrated from Mexico in the 1960s. The family moved from Chicago's Little Village neighborhood to Bolingbrook when she was a child due to the ongoing violence in Little Village.

Mendoza graduated from Bolingbrook High School in 1990 where she earned All‐State and All‐Midwest honors in varsity soccer. She then attended Truman State University in Kirksville, Missouri on a soccer and academic scholarship and graduating in 1994 with a B.A. in Business Administration. She played for the soccer team from 1990 to 1994, redshirting during the 1993 season after suffering an injury in the first game. In total, she scored 10 goals and recorded 10 assists in 68 appearances for Truman.

After college, Mendoza moved to Chicago and lived with her family for they had relocated back to their Little Village neighborhood. It was at this time, while working a full-time job, that she became a local community organizer for her neighborhood and got involved in Chicago politics.

Rise in politics

Mendoza became involved with Southwest Side Chicago politics in the mid-1990s. As a young operative, she lost a 1998 bid for the Illinois House. In 1999, she was invited to coordinate the aldermanic runoff campaign of Chicago First Ward incumbent Jesse Granato. Granato had been forced into a runoff by progressive independent candidate Cynthia Soto. Central to the mayor's aggressive development plans, the First Ward election was one of five hotly contested races in independent efforts to oppose the city's patronage political system. Granato's chief support came from then-Mayor Richard M. Daley as well as the controversial Hispanic Democratic Organization and Coalition for Better Government.

State representative
In 1998, Mendoza was slated by the regular Democratic Organization but lost to independent progressive incumbent Sonia Silva (1st Legislative District). In 2000, immediately after her victory for Granato and supported by Daley, the Hispanic Democratic Organization, and House Speaker Michael Madigan, Mendoza was slated and elected as an Illinois State Representative. At only 28, this made her the youngest member of the 92nd Illinois General Assembly.

Mendoza was Chairwoman of the International Trade and Commerce Committee, Vice-Chairwoman of the Bio-Technology Committee and was a member of the Labor, Public Utilities and Railroad Industry committees of the House. Mendoza served as Co-Chairwoman of the Conference of Women Legislators, and also co-founded the first Illinois Legislative Latino Caucus.

Mendoza was a known critic of then Illinois Governor Rod Blagojevich's staff in 2007. In 2008, Blagojevich blamed Mendoza, along with nine other Chicago Democrats, for lawmakers rejecting his capital bill; he also accused them of holding two taxpayer-paid jobs at once, being paid by the city or state at the same time as collecting salaries as state lawmakers. Mendoza took an unpaid leave from her job as a project coordinator with Chicago when she went to Springfield for legislative business. In her response to Blagojevich, Mendoza stated, "It is an obvious example that the governor is a pathological liar. If he honestly believes, in his lunacy, that 10 people from the City of Chicago controlled the fate of that doomed capital bill, he needs medical attention."

Mendoza served as an Illinois Democratic delegate in the primary elections for presidential candidates Al Gore in 2000 and John Kerry in 2004. In 2002, she visited the African countries of Uganda and Tanzania as a delegate for the American Council of Young Political Leaders. In June 2004, the State Department sent Mendoza to Brazil where she participated in a series of debates in which she represented the National Democratic Party's 2004 presidential platform.

Chicago city clerk

Mendoza was the first woman elected City Clerk in Chicago. In 2011, shortly after being elected, she took charge of an office responsible for more than $100 million in annual revenue from vehicle stickers. Mendoza spearheaded the Companion Animal and Consumer Protection Ordinance which banned Chicago pet stores from selling dogs, cats, or rabbits unless the animals are sourced from humane shelters or animal rescues. She changed the city's once-a-year vehicle sticker sales to year-round sales, saving about $4 million a year.

Illinois Comptroller
Mendoza ran for Illinois Comptroller in the 2016 special election, defeating the Republican incumbent Leslie Munger by 5% of the votes cast.

Mendoza was elected during a special election to fill out the remaining two years of the term won by the late Comptroller Judy Baar Topinka.

Mendoza took office amid a two-year budget impasse between the Governor and the General Assembly. In 2017, Politico named Mendoza to its national list of "18 to watch in 2018."

In her first year in office, Mendoza introduced and passed the Debt Transparency Act, which provides residents and legislators with a monthly accounting of the debts owed by every state agency. Though then-Governor Bruce Rauner vetoed the legislation, Republican and Democratic members of the House of Representatives overrode the veto unanimously. The State Senate likewise voted to override Gov. Rauner's veto with a 52 to 3 vote.

Her second year in office, she passed| three more Transparency bills: 1) The Truth-in-Hiring Act (requiring governors to list employees on their own payroll), 2) The Truth in Budgeting Act (requiring governors to address the state's Late Payment Interest Penalties in their proposed budgets) and 3) The Vendor Payment Program Transparency Act (requiring lenders to state vendors to disclose their owners and the source of their financing).

In 2018, Mendoza was re-elected as comptroller, winning 59.9% of the vote in an election against Republican nominee Darlene Senger.

2019 Chicago mayoral candidacy

On November 2, 2018, a video leaked from Mendoza's campaign signaling her intention to run for Mayor of Chicago in 2019 despite her concurrent run for re-election as Comptroller. Two weeks later on November 14, Mendoza launched her mayoral campaign to replace Mayor Rahm Emanuel.

On December 14, 2018, rival candidate Toni Preckwinkle challenged Mendoza's 12,500 petition signatures, which are required for Mendoza to appear on the ballot in February. Preckwinkle claimed that there were "a pattern of fraud, duplicate signatures, signatures that don't match addresses and faulty page numbers". On December 19, 2018, after a petition challenge was held to verify if the signatures supporting Mendoza's campaign were valid, Preckwinkle conceded the challenge as it was discovered that Mendoza had more than 13,000 valid signatures.

Mendoza emerged, early in her campaign, as one of the race's leaders in both polling and fundraising. In November and December 2018, publicly released polls consistently showed Mendoza and Toni Preckwinkle to be the top two polling candidates. At this point, the media was characterizing the race as a matchup between her and Preckwinkle, with the two being seen as the race's front-running candidates. Mendoza remained a top contender in polls released in January 2019, but was no longer consistently in the top-two. In February, Mendoza did not place in the top-two in any polls. (see 2019 Chicago mayoral election polls)

Mendoza was one of four mayoral candidates (alongside Toni Preckwinkle, Bill Daley, and Gery Chico) who had political ties to Alderman Edward M. Burke, whose corruption scandal upended the race for mayor.

Mendoza was perceived to be seeking strong support from Hispanic voters. In the end, she received the highest support among Hispanic voters of any candidate in the first round. However, Hispanic voter turnout was low.

Mendoza's campaign was endorsed by labor activist Dolores Huerta and LIUNA Chicago Laborers’ District Council.

Mendoza did not advance to the runoff for mayor, finishing 5th in the primary election with 9.05% of the vote. On March 23, 2019, Mendoza endorsed Lori Lightfoot for Mayor of Chicago in the runoff.

Personal life
In December 2011, Mendoza married David Szostak, who attended Bolingbrook High School with her. In 2012, their son was born.

She serves on the board of advisors of Let America Vote, an organization founded by former Missouri Secretary of State Jason Kander that aims to end voter suppression.

Electoral history

References

External links

 Office of the Illinois Comptroller
 Campaign website
 Official Illinois General Assembly websites:
 Rep. Susana Mendoza (D) 1st District, (2011–2012)
 Rep. Susana Mendoza (D) 1st District, (2009–2010)
 Rep. Susana Mendoza (D) 1st District, (2007–2008)
 Rep. Susana Mendoza (D) 1st District, (2005–2006)
 Rep. Susana Mendoza (D) 1st District, (2003–2004)

|-

|-

1972 births
21st-century American politicians
21st-century American women politicians
City and town clerks
Comptrollers of Illinois
Hispanic and Latino American state legislators in Illinois
Hispanic and Latino American women in politics
Living people
Democratic Party members of the Illinois House of Representatives
People from Bolingbrook, Illinois
Women state legislators in Illinois
American democracy activists
Mexican-American people in Illinois politics
American women's soccer players
Women's association football midfielders
Soccer players from Illinois
Truman Bulldogs women's soccer players